The 2016 Auto Club 400 was a NASCAR Sprint Cup Series race  held on March 20, 2016, at Auto Club Speedway in Fontana, California. Contested over 200 laps, it was fifth race of the 2016 NASCAR Sprint Cup Series season. Jimmie Johnson won the race. Kevin Harvick finished second. Denny Hamlin, Joey Logano and Ricky Stenhouse Jr. rounded out the top-five.

Austin Dillon won the pole, but led zero laps on his way to finishing 24th. Harvick led a race high of 142 laps on his way to a runner-up finish. There were 26 lead changes among eight different drivers, as well as six caution flag periods for 33 laps.

This was the 77th career victory for Johnson, second of the season, sixth at Auto Club Speedway and 10th at the track for Hendrick Motorsports. The win moved Johnson up to second in the points standings. Chevrolet increased their lead to nine-points over Toyota in the manufacturer standings.

The Auto Club 400 was carried by Fox Sports on the broadcast Fox network for the American television audience. The radio broadcast for the race was carried by the Motor Racing Network and Sirius XM NASCAR Radio.

Report

Background

It is also used for open wheel racing events. The racetrack is located near the former locations of Ontario Motor Speedway and Riverside International Raceway. The track is owned and operated by International Speedway Corporation and is the only track owned by ISC to have naming rights sold. The speedway is served by the nearby Interstate 10 and Interstate 15 freeways as well as a Metrolink station located behind the backstretch.

Entry list
The entry list for the Auto Club 400 was released on Monday, March 14 at 3:25 p.m. Eastern time. Thirty-nine cars were entered for the race. Two driver changes from the previous race included Brian Vickers returning to the seat of the No. 14 Stewart-Haas Racing Chevrolet and Jeffrey Earnhardt returning to the No. 32 Go FAS Racing Ford.

Practice

First practice

Qualifying

Being his second career pole and first since the 2014 Daytona 500, he said he was glad he "got a pole somewhere else. To do it at a driver’s race track like this at Fontana it means a lot to me. Just proud of this American Ethanol team we’ve had fast cars all year long. I knew going into that third session if I didn’t make mistakes I would have a shot. I just stayed with it off of (Turn) 4. I kept my locker locked as much as I could with the gas just keeping as much fuel to the car as I could. It worked out for us.” Adding to his impressive start to the season, he also said that this was "the start of what we need to be doing as a group. I feel like we have everything all the other companies have. We still have a lot of work to do, but it feels good to have a small moral victory here.” After qualifying second, Kevin Harvick complemented the great "effort by Rodney and the team getting the car ready. This track is a challenge with its bumps and rough surface and the lower downforce makes them harder to drive but we’ve got a good car and looking forward to Sunday. Our goal was to run the same lap time all three rounds. That is going to put you in a spot to have a chance. All in all, it’s been a good start to the weekend and really looking forward to the race on Sunday.” After qualifying third, Denny Hamlin said he's "had fast cars all year long, and I knew going into that third session, if I didn’t make mistakes I would have a shot. I just stayed with it off of 4. I kept my locker locked as much as I could with the gas just keeping as much fuel to the car as I could. It worked out for us.”

Qualifying results

Practice (post-qualifying)

Second practice
Kurt Busch went to a backup car after slamming the wall in turn 3. Because this took place after qualifying, he'll start the race from the rear of the field.

Final practice
Greg Biffle and Kyle Larson made contact with each other exiting turn 4. Larson went to a backup car and will start from the rear of the field.

Race

First half

Start

Under clear California skies, Austin Dillon led the field to the green flag at 3:49 p.m. He was passed going into turn 1 for the lead by Kevin Harvick. After five laps, Dillon fell back to third. Carl Edwards made a charge at Harvick, but he failed to make the pass. By lap 17, Harvick's gap grew to two seconds over Edwards. Kyle Busch was running fifth when he made an unscheduled stop for a flat right-rear tire on lap 20. He rejoined the race in 37th one-lap down. The first caution of the race flew on lap 27 for a single-car wreck in turn 2. Riding the high line, Chris Buescher suffered a right-rear tire blowout and made contact with the wall. Edwards exited pit road with the race lead. Greg Biffle, Kurt Busch and Kasey Kahne were tagged for their crews being over the wall too soon and restarted the race from the tail-end of the field.

The race restarted on lap 32. Harvick got a run on Edwards going down the backstretch to retake the lead on lap 35. Coming to the lead, Edwards took back the lead on lap 36. Going into turn 1, Harvick drove underneath Edwards to retake the lead on lap 38. The second caution of the race flew on lap 47 for a single-car wreck on the backstretch. Exiting turn 2, Kyle Larson cut down his left-rear tire, hit the outside wall, turned down the track and slammed the inside wall head-on. He said that he "was going down the back stretch and I think it was my left-rear tire got cut. It must have ripped the brake line because I went to push the pedal and it went straight to the floor board. I couldn’t slow down. It was definitely a hard hit there, probably one of the harder ones of my career. Even before that we were pretty sub-average there, we were pretty bad. Disappointed in our run today, but glad I’m alright. It was really good for about 20 laps on each run. The take-off speed was awesome and I don’t know I just couldn’t get the thing to last for a whole run. We just kind of struggled there at the end of each run, that kind of hurt us, but short-run speed that was a lot of fun. I thought we were as competitive as anybody on short-run speed. We just needed something there for the last 10 to 15 laps. We will work on it. The pit crew was awesome. They bounced back with great stops all day.” He would go on to finish 39th. Brad Keselowski was tagged for an uncontrolled tire and restarted the race from the tail-end of the field.

Second quarter
The race restarted on lap 54. Harvick made an unscheduled stop from the lead on lap 71 for a vibration. Martin Truex Jr. assumed the lead while Harvick rejoined the race in 33rd. A. J. Allmendinger also pitted from 10th for a vibration. Jimmie Johnson took the lead from Truex on lap 78. He hit pit road on lap 84 and handed the lead to teammate Chase Elliott. He pitted the next lap and handed the lead to Matt Kenseth. He pitted the next lap and the lead cycled to Harvick. Denny Hamlin and Paul Menard were tagged for speeding and were forced to serve pass-through penalty's. Matt DiBenedetto was tagged for removing equipment from his pit box and was forced to serve a pass-through penalty.

Second half

Halfway
Harvick pitted from the lead on lap 106 and handed the lead to Johnson. The third caution of the race flew on lap 108 for a single-car wreck in turn 2. Round the turn, Trevor Bayne got too close to the wall and rode it. Harvick opted not to pit under the caution and assumed the lead from Johnson. Clint Bowyer was tagged for his crew being over the wall too soon and restarted the race from the tail-end of the field.

The race restarted on lap 115. Harvick on older tires was no match for Johnson on new tires as the latter took the lead with 85 laps to go. The fourth caution of the race flew with 79 laps to go for a single-car wreck in turn 1. Going into the turn, Danica Patrick got hooked into the wall by Kahne and slammed the wall head-on. She walked towards the racing surface to show her displeasure towards Kahne. She said afterwards that she "saw him chase me down the track, and the next thing I know I was getting spun up the track. We had a restart and I was low on him, and if you go high it’ll drag you both back so I was going low. I was passing him. He was behind me on the right rear end. I don’t know what kind of day he was having – I heard he was a lap down – and I feel bad if he felt he was put in a position and got desperate there. He must’ve been having a very rough time. I was looking forward to a good finish but unfortunately it wasn’t meant to be." She, Kahne, and his crew chief, Keith Rodden, were called to the NASCAR hauler after the race. Johnson and Truex swapped the lead on pit road. The latter excited pit road with the lead. Biffle and Edwards were tagged for speeding and restarted the race from the tail-end of the field.

The race restarted with 70 laps to go. Harvick got a run on the outside line exiting turn 4 to retake the lead with 63 laps to go. Kenseth made an unscheduled stop with 52 laps to go for a flat tire. To add insult to injury, he was tagged for speeding and was forced to serve a pass-through penalty. Dale Earnhardt Jr. and Johnson pitted with 46 laps to go. Debris in turn 3 brought out the fifth caution of the race with 45 laps to go. Johnson opted to stay out when Harvick pitted and assumed the lead. Truex was tagged for speeding and restarted the race from the tail-end of the field.

Fourth quarter
The race restarted with 40 laps to go. Edwards outdrove Johnson to the line to retake the lead with 39 laps to go. Johnson drove under him in turn 1 to retake the lead with 38 laps to go. Joey Logano drove under Johnson in turn 2 to take the lead with 36 laps to go. Harvick outdrove Logano to the line to retake the lead with 34 laps to go. Driving down the backstretch, Harvick nudged Logano's rear to retain the lead with 33 laps to go. With 14 laps to go, Logano took the air off Truex's car going into turn 1 and sent him into the wall. This would lead to Truex cutting a tire down, making an unscheduled stop and finishing 32nd. Logano said after the race that he had "no excuse besides it was just racing. I tried to go underneath him and fake that and then go back to the top, and I think he was going to go to the top as well. We never touched, but I was right on him, and when you're going that fast and you take the air off the spoilers, the cars get uncontrollable. So I hate that I hurt his day, for sure." The sixth caution of the race flew with two laps to go for a single-car wreck in turn 4. Kyle Busch made contact with the wall and had a tire coming apart. Hamlin exited pit road with the race lead. Kenseth was tagged for an uncontrolled tire and restarted the race from the tail-end of the field.

Overtime
The race restarted with two laps to go. Johnson drove by Hamlin and Harvick to score the victory.

Post-race

Driver comments
Speaking on the final restart, Johnson said he "got a great run off of Turn 2 and I thought ‘man I’ve got a shot at this thing’. Which I didn't expect to have, Harvick has been so fast. I cleared him and kind of got away. We saved our best for last for sure. We had our best at the last there and really strong on the short run which wasn't necessarily our strong suit earlier in the day. Chad (Knaus, crew chief) made some great adjustments there to get me tuned up for that dash at the end.”

Harvick said after the race that the final restart "was the worst it has taken off on restarts, but we weren’t very good on restarts for four or five laps unless we were all by ourselves. The No. 48 was able to hang with us and we just weren’t able to drive it in like I needed to.”

Penalties
On the Thursday after the race, Danica Patrick was fined $20,000 for walking up towards the racing surface to show her displeasure to Kahne which led to her being placed on probation as well. In addition, six teams were issued warnings for failing tech inspection multiple times.

Race results

Race summary
 Lead changes: 29  
 Cautions/Laps: 6 for 13
 Red flags: 0
 Time of race: 2 hours, 59 minutes and 17 seconds
 Average speed:

Media

Television
The race was sixteenth race Fox Sports covered at the Auto Club Speedway. Mike Joy, three-time Auto Club winner Jeff Gordon and Darrell Waltrip had call in the booth for the race. Jamie Little, Chris Neville and Matt Yocum handled the pit road duties for the television side.

Radio
MRN had the radio call for the race which was also simulcasted on Sirius XM NASCAR Radio. Joe Moore, Jeff Striegle and 2001 race winner Rusty Wallace called the race from the booth when the field was racing down the front stretch. Dan Hubbard called race from a billboard outside turn 2 when the field was racing through turns 1 and 2. Kurt Becker called the race from a billboard outside turn 3 when the field was racing through turns 3 and 4. Alex Hayden, Winston Kelley and Steve Post worked pit road for MRN.

Standings after the race

Drivers' Championship standings

Manufacturers' Championship standings

Note: Only the first 16 positions are included for the driver standings.

Notes

References

Auto Club 400
Auto Club 400
NASCAR races at Auto Club Speedway
Auto Club 400